Natakamani was a King of Kush who reigned from around or earlier than 1 BC to c. AD 20. Natakamani is the best attested ruler of the Meroitic period. He was born to queen Amanishakheto.

Monumental remains
Natakamani is known from several temple buildings and from his pyramid in Meroe. He is also known for restoring the temple of Amun, as well as his dedication of the temple at Faras. On several monuments he appears together with co-regent Queen Amanitore. The relationship between the two is not clear: she might have been his wife, or his mother, who served as his regent while he was still young. However, it is known that during the co-reign, they had almost equal rights as depicted in several temple sculptures. At the temple of Apedemak there is a relief showing him with his successor Arikhankharer.

Natakamani was preceded by Amanishakheto and succeeded by queen Amanitore.

Historical images

See also
 List of monarchs of Kush

References

1st-century BC monarchs of Kush
1st-century monarchs of Kush
1st-century monarchs in Africa
Year of birth unknown
Year of death unknown